Stephen Douglas Yerkes (May 15, 1888 – January 31, 1971) was a professional baseball player.

History 
Yerkes played all or part of seven seasons in Major League Baseball between 1909 and 1916, primarily as a second baseman. He played for the Boston Red Sox (1909, 1911–14), of the American League, Pittsburgh Rebels (1914–15) of the Federal League, and Chicago Cubs (1916) of the National League. Yerkes batted and threw right-handed. He was born in Hatboro, Pennsylvania.

In his major league career, Yerkes posted a .268 batting average with six home runs and 254 RBI in 711 games played. He played in the first game at Boston's Fenway Park, on April 20, 1912, in which he had five hits, including two doubles.  In the 1912 World Series, he drove in the winning run for the Red Sox in Game One, and scored the Series-winning run in the tenth inning of Game Eight.

After his major league career ended, Yerkes continued to play on and off in minor league baseball until 1923, mostly with the Indianapolis Indians. He then began a career as a manager, working with various minor league teams between 1924 and 1947.

In 1945, Yerkes received one vote from the Baseball Writers' Association of America in the Baseball Hall of Fame voting.

Yerkes died in Lansdale, Pennsylvania, at age 82 and was interred at Holy Sepulchre Cemetery in Cheltenham Township, Pennsylvania.

References

External links

Major League Baseball second basemen
Boston Red Sox players
Burials at Holy Sepulchre Cemetery
Chicago Cubs players
Pittsburgh Rebels players
Chattanooga Lookouts players
Atlanta Crackers players
Indianapolis Indians players
Baseball players from Pennsylvania
Minor league baseball managers
People from Hatboro, Pennsylvania
1888 births
1971 deaths
Goldsboro Giants players